Arbouin is a rural locality in the Shire of Mareeba, Queensland, Australia.

Geography
The Walsh River flows through the north-east corner from east to north.

History

References 

Shire of Mareeba
Localities in Queensland